Sexophone may refer to:

 Musical instrument in Aldous Huxley's 1932 novel Brave New World 
 Sexophone (show), a 1955 variety show produced by Curzio Malaparte
 Sexophone (synthesizer) or Dimi-S, a digital synthesizer created by Erkki Kurenniemi in 1972 where sound generation is based on the electric conductivity of the skin

See also

 Saxophone